Chvalíkovice is a municipality and village in Opava District in the Moravian-Silesian Region of the Czech Republic. It has about 700 inhabitants.

History
The first written mention of Chvalíkovice is from 1445.

Sights
The only monument is the Chapel of Saint Michael the Archangel from 1865.

References

External links

Villages in Opava District